This is a list of the number-one songs of 2018 in Guatemala. The airplay chart rankings are published by Monitor Latino, based on airplay across radio stations in Guatemala using the Radio Tracking Data, LLC in real time. Charts are compiled from Monday to Sunday.

Chart history
Besides the General chart, Monitor Latino publishes "Pop", "Regional Mexican" and "Anglo" charts for Guatemala. Monitor Latino provides two lists for each of these charts: the "Audience" list ranks the songs according to the number of people that listened to them on the radio during the week.
The "Tocadas" (Spins) list ranks the songs according to the number of times they were played on the radio during the week. Beginning in the June 17 week, Monitor Latino ceased to publish the separate Audience and Spins charts, instead publishing a combined chart.

General

Pop
This chart ranks Spanish-language songs from all genres, except for Regional Mexican music.

Regional Mexican

Anglo
This chart ranks English-language songs from all genres.

References

Guatemala 2018
Number-one songs
Guatemala